This is a List of German fashion designers.

A 
 Torsten Amft
 Iris von Arnim

B 
 Barbara Becker
 Gunda Beeg
 Maria Bogner
 Willy Bogner Jr.
 Willy Bogner Sr.
 Hugo Boss

C 
 Gregor Clemens

E 
 Barbara Engel
 Susanne Erichsen
 Escada

F 
 Prince Egon von Fürstenberg

G 
 Robert Geller
 Eva Gronbach

H 
 Otto Ludwig Haas-Heye
 Uli Herzner
 Mafalda von Hessen
 Claudia Hill
 Wolfgang Joop

K 
 Heidi Klum
 Guido Maria Kretschmer

L 
 Karl Lagerfeld
 Frank Leder
 Sonja de Lennart
 Gina-Lisa Lohfink
 Papis Loveday
 Otto Lucas

M 
 Tomas Maier
 Michael Michalsky
 Rudolph Moshammer
 Anna Muthesius

O 
 Heinz Oestergaard

P 
 Philipp Plein

R 
 Christian Roth

S 
 Boris Bidjan Saberi
 Donaldson Sackey
 Jil Sander
 Anna Scholz
 Alex Stenzel

T 
 Thea Tewi

W 
 John Weitz
 Bernhard Willhelm
 Tilmann Wröbel
 Noah Wunsch
 Gerhard Weber

 
Fashion designers
German